is the 20th single by Japanese singer Yōko Oginome. Written by Yōsui Inoue, the single was released on June 27, 1990 by Victor Entertainment.

Background and release
"Gallery" peaked at No. 15 on Oricon's singles chart and sold over 45,000 copies. The song earned Oginome the Best Talent Award at the 16th All Japan Kayo Music Festival. Oginome performed the song on the 41st Kōhaku Uta Gassen in 1990, making her fourth appearance on NHK's New Year's Eve special.

Track listing
All lyrics are written by Yōsui Inoue; all music is arranged by Atsushi Onozawa.

Charts

References

External links

1990 singles
Yōko Oginome songs
Japanese-language songs
Songs written by Yōsui Inoue
Victor Entertainment singles